Wenieka Ewing is a Turks & Caicos Islander fashion model and beauty pageant titleholder.

Information
A native of the town of Blue Hills, Providenciales Ewing's family members and friends noticed her looks and suggested a future in modeling. Ewing first won the 2004 Miss Turks and Caicos contest. Winning this contest guaranteed her right to compete in Miss Universe. Ewing arrived in May 2005 at Thailand to compete for the Miss Universe crown of that year. The contest's finale was held on 30 May. While in Bangkok for the international competition, Ewing won Thailand's Ministry of Tourism and Sports Award during the national costume competition. At 5'3", Ewing was the shortest delegate in the contest and could not beat the overwhelming odds in the highly competitive final. Canada's Natalie Glebova won the title. Ewing, who had just graduated high school when those beauty contests took place , was hoping to later become a Business Admiral in the Turks and Caicos Islands.

External links
MissUniverse.com
Thaimiss.com's page on Ewing

1985 births
Miss Universe 2005 contestants
Living people
Turks and Caicos Islands beauty pageant winners
Turks and Caicos Islands female models